Désirée Astrid Marianne Pethrus (born 19 February 1959) is a Swedish Christian Democratic politician. She was a substitute member of the Riksdag for Göran Hägglund from 2006 to 2010 and is now an ordinary member in her own right since 2010.

Her grandfather, Lewi Pethrus, was one of the founders of what is today the Christian Democrats.

External links
Désirée Pethrus Engström at the Riksdag website

Members of the Riksdag from the Christian Democrats (Sweden)
Living people
1959 births
Women members of the Riksdag
21st-century Swedish women politicians